Francis Oakes (1818 – 5 August 1866) was an Australian politician.

He was born in New South Wales to public servant Francis Oakes and Rebecca Oakes, née Small. He was a pastoralist with land in the Lachlan River district. From 1860 to 1861 he was a member of the New South Wales Legislative Council. Oakes died in 1866 at Parramatta.

References

1818 births
1866 deaths
Members of the New South Wales Legislative Council
19th-century Australian politicians